Bybee House may refer to:

Bybee House (Glasgow, Kentucky), listed on the National Register of Historic Places
Bybee House (Winchester, Kentucky), listed on the National Register of Historic Places
Bybee–Howell House, Sauvie Island, Oregon, listed on the National Register of Historic Places